William Joseph Schwartz III better known as William Joseph, is an American pianist and recording artist from Phoenix, Arizona. He has released three studio albums: Within (2004), Beyond (2008) and Be Still (2012).

Life and career
At age 8 Joseph won a full music scholarship provided by the Boys Clubs of America, enabling him to study piano with Russian pianist Stella Saperstein. Joseph is a member of the Church of Jesus Christ of Latter-day Saints.

He was the first teacher hired by Piano Warehouse in Phoenix, Arizona and taught for the company Arizona Music Lessons, later renamed the Arizona Music Academy, for which he still performs short teaching periods.

In 2003, Joseph performed at a charity event in his hometown and bumped into David Foster, for whom he played. Foster was impressed, and they began collaborating, eventually writing several songs together that would appear on 2004's Within, Joseph's major-label debut. By this time, Joseph was signed under Foster's 143 Records, a sub-label of Reprise Records and Warner Bros. Records.

In August and September 2004, Joseph opened for Josh Groban's "Closer Tour", covering 12 cities in the US and Canada, giving 16 concerts. During November and December 2005, Joseph was the opening act for Clay Aiken's "Joyful Noise Tour", which covered 36 cities in the US and Canada, giving 40 concerts.

2008 saw the release of Joseph's second album Beyond. In 2009, Joseph played an acoustic version of "Within" for BETA Records TV.

In 2012, he released his third album Be Still.

Discography
Albums

References

External links
 Official website
 Uncut interview on The Hour
 Piano Fantasy Video

American pop pianists
American male pianists
Living people
Musicians from Phoenix, Arizona
Warner Music Group artists
Latter Day Saints from Arizona
21st-century American pianists
21st-century American male musicians
1980 births